Robin Grey may refer to:
Robin Grey-Gardner
Robin Gray (disambiguation)